Florence Kikelomo Ajayi is a Nigerian football defender, currently playing for Dínamo Guadalajara in the Spanish Second Division.

Career 
Ajayi started her career in the Nigerian Championship for Koko Queens, Rivers Angels, Jagede Babes and Pelican Stars. After playing the 1999 World Cup she signed for 1.FFC Niederkirchen in the German Bundesliga, where she spent two seasons. Returning to Nigeria, she played for Police Machine and Bayelsa Queen until 2008 when she moved to Tianjin Teda in the Chinese Super League. In 2010, she returned to the European leagues one decade later, playing successively for Krka Novo Mesto in Slovenia, Pogoń Szczecin in Poland and Dínamo Guadalajara in the Spanish second tier.

International 
As a member of the Nigerian national team Ajayi won five African Championships in a row between 1998 and 2006, and took part in the 1999 and 2003 World Cups and the 2000 and 2008 Summer Olympics. She served as the Nigerian women team's captain.

Footnotes
 FIFA World Cup (including qualifications) and Olympics matches only.

References

1977 births
Living people
Women's association football defenders
Nigerian women's footballers
People from Akure
Yoruba sportswomen
Nigeria women's international footballers
1999 FIFA Women's World Cup players
2003 FIFA Women's World Cup players
Olympic footballers of Nigeria
Footballers at the 2000 Summer Olympics
Footballers at the 2008 Summer Olympics
Nigerian expatriate women's footballers
Nigerian expatriate sportspeople in Germany
Expatriate women's footballers in Germany
Nigerian expatriate sportspeople in China
Expatriate women's footballers in China
Nigerian expatriate sportspeople in Slovenia
Expatriate women's footballers in Slovenia
Nigerian expatriate sportspeople in Poland
Expatriate women's footballers in Poland
Nigerian expatriate sportspeople in Spain
Expatriate women's footballers in Spain
Bayelsa Queens F.C. players
Pelican Stars F.C. players
Rivers Angels F.C. players
ŽNK Krka players
1. FFC 08 Niederkirchen players